Aldrichia is a genus of bee flies (insects in the family Bombyliidae).

Species
These species belong to the genus Aldrichia:
A. auripuncta Painter, 1940
A. ehrmanii Coquillett, 1894

References

Further reading

External links

 

Articles created by Qbugbot
Bombyliidae genera
Taxa named by Daniel William Coquillett